Pseudoprotoceras is an extinct genus of Artiodactyla, of the family Protoceratidae, endemic to central North America. Pseudoprotoceras resembled hornless deer, but were more closely related to camelids.

Body mass was similar to other Eocene protoceratids such as Heteromeryx and Poabromylus yet greater than Leptotragulus and Leptoreodon. Miocene members were apparently larger as well.

References

McKenna, Malcolm C., and Bell, Susan K. 1997. Classification of Mammals Above the Species Level. Columbia University Press, New York, 631 pp. 

 
Eocene even-toed ungulates
Bartonian extinctions
Eocene mammals of North America
Fossil taxa described in 1934
Prehistoric even-toed ungulate genera